Macherla Niyojakavargam is a 2022 Indian Telugu-language action film written and directed by M. S. Rajashekhar Reddy, and produced by Sreshth Movies. The film stars Nithiin, Krithi Shetty and Catherine Tresa. It was released in theatres on 12 August 2022

Plot 

Siddhartha Reddy gets a posting as a district collector for the Guntur district in Andhra Pradesh. There he goes against Rajappa, a local rowdy and politician.

Cast 
 Nithiin as N. Siddharth Reddy IAS
 Krithi Shetty as Swathi
 Catherine Tresa as Nidhi
 Samuthirakani as MLA Rajappa/Veera
 Rajendra Prasad as Surendra
 Vennela Kishore as Guru
 Murali Sharma as Narendra
 Jayaprakash
 Indraja
 Subhalekha Sudhakar
 Brahmaji
 Anjali special appearance in the song "Ra Ra Reddy I'm Ready"

Production 
On 10 September 2021, Sreshth Movies made an announcement, on the occasion of Vinayak Chaturthi, with a puja ceremony of their upcoming movie with Nithiin.

|url=https://www.news18.com/amp/news/movies/nithins-macherla-niyojakavargam-release-date-postponed-to-august-12-5139871.html |access-date=9 May 2022}}</ref> and received mostly negative reviews from critics.

Music

The music is composed by Mahathi Swara Sagar, his third collaboration with Nithiin, after Bheeshma and Maestro. The audio is distributed by Aditya Music.

The first single titled "Chill Maro" was sung by Nakash Aziz, Sanjana Kalmanje and it was released on 31 May 2022. The second single titled "Ra Ra Reddy I'm Ready" was released on 9 July 2022. A part of the song "Ranu Ranu Antundi Chinnadho" from Nithiin's first film Jayam too was recreated within the song.

Release 
The film was released in theatres on 12 August 2022.

References

2020s Telugu-language films